Evgeny Donskoy was the defending champion but lost in the first round.
Aljaž Bedene won the final after defeating Nicolas Devilder 7–6(8–6), 7–6(7–4) in the final.

Seeds

Draw

Finals

Top half

Bottom half

References
 Main draw
 Qualifying draw

2012 Singles
Casablanca Singles